"Silver Star" is the lead song on the Four Seasons album Who Loves You. As was the case of all the songs on the LP, it was written by Bob Gaudio and Judy Parker and produced by Gaudio. Drummer Gerry Polci sang lead. Frankie Valli's contribution was limited to harmony vocals, since he was gradually losing his hearing in the 1970s due to otosclerosis. An operation restored most of Valli's hearing in the 1980s.

Reception
Billboard said that "Silver Star" is an "infectious rocker with a disco feel," saying further that it sometimes sounds like early Who songs.  Cash Box called the song "an up-tempo cut, with strong emphasis...on vocal harmony," stating that "acoustic guitars hold up the rhythm tracks" and that "the song has a couple of interesting breaks that work well to hook the listener into the song." Record World said that it should "should keep the group's streak [of hits] alive without anydifficulty."

Chart performance
Released shortly after the #3 (US) hit "Who Loves You" and the #1 "December, 1963 (Oh, What a Night)", both of which Polci was also lead or co-lead, the single was an edited version of a six-minute, nine second, song that married lyrics of love and Western movies with a disco beat that was the signature of "Who Loves You". The single reached #38 on the Billboard Hot 100. The song was far more successful in the United Kingdom, however, reaching #3 on the UK singles chart, although its chart run was short-lived and somewhat erratic there.  The group played the song on the 8 April 1976 broadcast episode of "Top of the Pops" (with Noel Edmonds hosting).

Weekly charts

References

1976 singles
Curb Records singles
The Four Seasons (band) songs
Songs written by Bob Gaudio
Song recordings produced by Bob Gaudio
Warner Records singles